José Trasimundo Mascarenhas Barreto, 7th Marquis of Fronteira (Lisbon; 11 January 1802 — 19 February 1881); was a Portuguese nobleman and politician.

Life 
José Trasimundo Mascarenhas Barreto was born in Lisbon on 11 January 1802 to João José Luís de Mascarenhas Barreto, 6th Marquis of Fronteira, and Leonor Benedita de Almeida e Almeida, daughter of Leonor de Almeida Portugal, 4th Marquise of Alorna.

He married on February 14, 1821 Maria Constança da Câmara, Lady of the Order of Saint Isabel, and maid of honour of Queen Maria II of Portugal.

He had only one daughter, D. Maria Mascarenhas Barreto.

Portuguese nobility
1802 births
1881 deaths
People from Lisbon
19th-century Portuguese people
Military personnel of the Liberal Wars